Prunus caroliniana, known as the Carolina laurelcherry, Carolina cherry laurel, Carolina cherry, or Cherry laurel, is a small evergreen flowering tree native to the lowlands of Southeastern United States, from North Carolina south to Florida and westward to central Texas. The species also has escaped into the wild in a few places in California.

Prunus caroliniana is not to be confused with its European relative, Prunus laurocerasus, which also is called Cherry Laurel, although mainly known as English Laurel in the U.S.

Description
Reproductively mature trees have entire margins, whereas immature ones often have subtle serrations. The twigs are red to grayish brown, slender, and glabrous. When crushed, the leaves and green twigs emit a fragrance described as resembling maraschino cherries or almond extract.

Ecology
The tree is a host plant for coral hairstreak, eastern tiger swallowtail, red-spotted purple, spring azures, summer azures, and viceroy butterflies where adult butterflies nectar from the spring flowers while the fruits are eaten by songbirds, wild turkeys, quail, raccoons, foxes, and small mammals.

Cultivation
The species has long been an ornamental tree and landscape hedge shrub in gardens in many parts of the Atlantic states of the United States. The tree is considered hardy in USDA zones 7B through 10A. It is often used in areas where a tough broadleaved evergreen tree is needed of modest size. It prefers full sun and well-drained, acidic soil, often developing chlorosis if grown in overly alkaline soil.

Cultivars
Cultivated varieties include:
Prunus caroliniana 'Compacta' grows to about half the usual height and width of the species.
Prunus caroliniana 'Cherry Ruffles' has wavy/ruffled leaf margins.

Toxicity 
The leaves and branches contain high amounts of cyanogenic glycosides that break down into hydrogen cyanide when damaged, making it a potential toxic hazard to grazing livestock and children. Due to this, it is considered highly deer-resistant.

References

External links

 
 Prunus carolina in the Native Plant Identification Network
 

caroliniana
Prunus caroliniana
Trees of the Southern United States
Garden plants of North America
Plants described in 1768
Bird food plants